RAF Sedgeford was a Royal Air Force airfield, located in the East of England county of Norfolk, East Anglia.

History
RAF Sedgeford was used as an airfield in the First World War, as a satellite airfield (officially called "Night Landing Grounds") of RAF Great Yarmouth.

First World War
During the First World War, the airfield was used for home defence duties, and was initially attached to the Royal Navy. By 1916, the Royal Flying Corps, a precursor to the current Royal Air Force, took over the facilities.

After the conclusion of the war, RAF Sedgeford was abandoned around 1919 to 1920.

Units
 No. 3 Fighting School
 No. 7 Training Squadron
 No. 9 Training Squadron
 No. 13 Squadron RAF
 24th Aero Squadron
 No. 45 Squadron RAF
 No. 53 Reserve Squadron
 No. 64 Squadron RAF
 No. 65 Reserve Squadron
 No. 65 Training Squadron
 No. 72 Squadron RAF
 No. 87 Squadron RAF
 No. 110 Squadron RAF
 No. 122 Squadron RAF

Second World War
RAF Sedgeford was reused during the Second World War, when it was classified as a 'Q-type' and 'K-type' bombing decoy.

The buildings and hangars on site made it a dummy airfield, which prevented nearby, functional airfields from being bombed by enemy bombers. At night, the airfield was lighted up, and made to look like an active airfield in order to trick the enemy, again to prevent nearby airfields from being bombed.

Official records recorded RAF Sedgeford to be in operation from June 1940 to August 1942.

Present state
Smaller buildings, dating back to the First World War, survive, as does an air raid shelter that was built during the Second World War.

See also
List of former Royal Air Force stations

References

External links
 Approximate location of RAF Sedgeford

Sedgeford